In enzymology, an alizarin 2-beta-glucosyltransferase is an enzyme that catalyzes the chemical reaction

UDP-glucose + alizarin  UDP + 1-hydroxy-2-(beta-D-glucosyloxy)-9,10-anthraquinone

Thus, the two substrates of this enzyme are UDP-glucose and alizarin, whereas its two products are UDP and 1-hydroxy-2-(beta-D-glucosyloxy)-9,10-anthraquinone.

This enzyme belongs to the family of glycosyltransferases, specifically the hexosyltransferases.  The systematic name of this enzyme class is UDP-glucose:1,2-dihydroxy-9,10-anthraquinone 2-O-beta-D-glucosyltransferase. This enzyme is also called uridine diphosphoglucose-alizarin glucosyltransferase.

References

 

EC 2.4.1
Enzymes of unknown structure